Matteson is a ghost town in Crystal Township, Phillips County, Kansas, United States.

History
Matteson was issued a post office in 1875. The post office was discontinued in 1894.

References

Former populated places in Phillips County, Kansas
Former populated places in Kansas